Michael Jacobs may refer to:

Michael A. Jacobs (1860–1936), American businessman and politician
Michael J. Jacobs (born 1952), English photojournalist
Michael Jacobs (footballer) (born 1991), English footballer
Michael Jacobs (art and travel writer) (1952–2014)
Michael Jacobs (economist) (born 1960), British economist
Michael Jacobs (physician) (born 1964), British medical consultant in infectious diseases 
Michael Jacobs (activist), Dutch activist
Michael Jacobs (producer), American television producer

See also
Mike Jacobs (disambiguation)
Michael Jacob (born 1980), Irish hurling player